Nemat Talaat Shafik, Baroness Shafik,  (Arabic: نعمت شفيق; born 13 August 1962), known as Minouche Shafik, is an Egyptian-born British-American economist who has been serving as the President and Vice Chancellor of the London School of Economics since September 2017. Beginning on 1 July 2023, she will serve as the 20th and incoming president of Columbia University, the first woman since its founding in the year 1754. She also currently serves as Board Member of Bill & Melinda Gates Foundation.

Shafik previously served as the Deputy Governor of the Bank of England from August 2014 to February 2017. Prior to this, she was the Permanent Secretary of the Department for International Development from March 2008 to March 2011 and also served as Vice President at World Bank, and later she went on to serve as the Deputy Managing Director of the International Monetary Fund.

Early life and education
Shafik was born in Alexandria, Egypt, Shafik to parents who were both educators. As a child, she went to Schutz American School. The family moved to Savannah, Georgia in the mid-1960s, and subsequently to Miami, Florida, and Raleigh, North Carolina. When she was 15, the family returned to Egypt. 

Shafik studied at the American University in Cairo. She received a Bachelor of Arts summa cum laude with a major in economics and politics from the University of Massachusetts Amherst in 1983, a Master of Science in economics from the University of London (London School of Economics) in 1986, and a Doctor of Philosophy in economics from the University of Oxford (St Antony's College) in 1989.

Career
Shafik joined the World Bank after Oxford and held a variety of roles, starting in the research department where she worked on global economic modelling and forecasting and then later on environmental issues. She moved to do macroeconomic work on Eastern Europe during the transition and in the Middle East where she published a number of books and articles on the region's economic future, the economics of peace, labour markets, regional integration, and gender issues.

Shafik became the youngest ever Vice President at the World Bank at the age of 36.

She initially went to the British Government's Department for International Development (DFID) on secondment as Director General for Country Programmes where she was responsible for all of DFID's overseas offices and financing across Africa, the Middle East, Asia, Latin America, and Eastern Europe. She was appointed as DFID's Permanent Secretary in 2008 where she managed a bilateral aid programme in over 100 countries, multilateral policies and financing for the United Nations, European Union and international financial institutions, and overall development policy and research – responsible for 2400 staff and a budget of £38 billion (about US$60 billion) for 2011–2014. During her tenure, DFID was described by the OECD independent peer review as "a recognised international leader in development".

Shafik served as IMF Deputy Managing Director from April 2011 until March 2014. As Deputy Managing Director, she was responsible for the IMF's work in Europe and the Middle East, a $1 billion administrative budget, human resources for its 3,000 staff and the IMF's training and technical assistance for policy makers around the world.

Shafik joined the Bank of England as its first Deputy Governor on Markets and Banking responsible for the Bank's £500 billion balance sheet and served as a Member of the bank's Monetary Policy Committee, Financial Policy Committee and the Board of the Prudential Regulatory Authority. She led the Bank's Fair and Effective Markets review to tackle misconduct in financial markets. On 12 September 2016, it was announced that Shafik had been appointed as the next Director of the London School of Economics, replacing sociologist Craig Calhoun. She took up the post on 1 September 2017.

On 18 January 2023, It was announced that Shafik would become the next President of Columbia University, starting 1 July 2023.

Academic work

Shafik has held academic appointments, both as Adjunct Professor in the Economics Department at Georgetown University from 1989 to 1994, and as Visiting Associate Professor at the Wharton Business School of the University of Pennsylvania in Spring 1996.

She has authored, edited, and co-authored a number of books. She authored Prospects for the Middle East and North African Economies: from Boom to Bust and Back? (14 editions, 1997 to 2016) and Economic Challenges Facing Middle Eastern and North African Countries (14 editions, 1997 to 2016). 

She has written articles for a number of publications, including Oxford Economic Papers, The Columbia Journal of World Business, The Middle East Journal, Journal of African Finance and Economic Development, World Development, and the Journal of Development Economics. She contributes to a blog with other heads of development agencies at Ideas4development.org.

In September 2016, Shafik was appointed as the 16th Director of the London School of Economics (LSE), effective from 1 September 2017.

Other activities

Corporate boards
 Siemens, Member of the Supervisory Board

Advisory roles
Shafik has chaired several international consultative groups including: the Consultative Group to Assist the Poor, the Energy Sector Management Assistance Programme, the Global Water and Sanitation Program, Cities Alliance, InfoDev, the Public-Private Infrastructure Advisory Facility, and the Global Corporate Governance Forum. She was instrumental in launching the Africa Infrastructure Consortium. She served on a number of boards including the Middle East Advisory Group to the International Monetary Fund, and the Economic Research Forum for the Arab World, Iran and Turkey. She is also active on the board and as a mentor to the Minority Ethnic Talent Association which supports under-represented groups to advance to senior positions in the civil service.

Shafik currently serves as a Trustee of the British Museum, the Council of the Institute for Fiscal Studies, the Task Force on Fiscal Policy for Health, the New Economy Forum, and the Per Jacobsson Foundation. As deputy chair of the British Museum's Board of Trustees, she led the search process which led to the appointment of George Osborne as new chair in 2021. 

In 2021, Shafik was appointed to the Pandemic Preparedness Partnership (PPP), an expert group chaired by Patrick Vallance to advise the G7 presidency held by the government of Prime Minister Boris Johnson.

Recognition
Shafik was made a Dame Commander of the Order of the British Empire (DBE) in the June 2015 Queen's Birthday Honours.

She was named "GG2 Woman of the Year" in 2009. She was named as one of Forbes 100 most powerful women in 2015 and received the 100 Women in Finance European Industry Leaders Award in 2019.

She was gazetted as Baroness Shafik, of Camden in the London Borough of Camden and of Alexandria in the Arab Republic of Egypt, in the 2020 Political Honours and was introduced to the House of Lords on 15 October 2020. She sits as a crossbencher and made her maiden speech on 28 January 2021.

Shafik was elected a honorary fellow of the British Academy in 2021 and was awarded an honorary doctorate from Utrecht University.

Personal life
After joining the World Bank, Shafik married economist Mohamed El-Erian. With her second husband, scientist Raffael Jovine, she has twin children and three stepchildren; of note, her daughter is an alumnus of Columbia GSAPP's urban planning program. She speaks English, Arabic, and French and holds both US and UK nationality.

References

Sources

External links
 Executive Office of LSE Archived, LSE 2023
 Meet Minouche Shafik Columbia University 2023
 Full text of doctoral thesis, "Private investment and public policy in Egypt, 1960-1986" via Oxford Research Archive
 Shafik on BBC Radio 4's Desert Island Discs in 2018

1962 births
Living people
People from Alexandria
20th-century Egyptian economists
Egyptian women economists
Permanent Under-Secretaries of State for International Development
World Bank Group people
University of Massachusetts Amherst alumni
Alumni of the University of London
Alumni of the London School of Economics
Alumni of St Antony's College, Oxford
Columbia University faculty
Egyptian emigrants to England
Egyptian emigrants to the United States
Department for International Development
International Monetary Fund
Deputy Governors of the Bank of England
Dames Commander of the Order of the British Empire
Naturalised citizens of the United Kingdom
Life peeresses created by Elizabeth II
Bill & Melinda Gates Foundation people